Charles Bohn  (October, 1856 – August 1, 1903), was a professional baseball player who played outfield and pitcher in the Major Leagues for the 1882 Louisville Eclipse.

He was buried at Woodland Cemetery in Cleveland, Ohio.

References

External links

1856 births
1903 deaths
Major League Baseball outfielders
Major League Baseball pitchers
Louisville Eclipse players
19th-century baseball players
Davenport Brown Stockings players
Johnstown (minor league baseball) players
Dayton Gem Citys players
Omaha Omahogs players
Keokuk Hawkeyes players
Mansfield (minor league baseball) players
Charleston Seagulls players
Sandusky Fish Eaters players
Grand Rapids (minor league baseball) players
Galesburg (minor league baseball) players
Indianapolis (minor league baseball) players
Meadville (minor league baseball) players
Baseball players from Cleveland
Burials at Woodland Cemetery (Cleveland)
Elkhart (minor league baseball) players